Elections to the Baseball Hall of Fame for 1998 followed the system in use since 1995.
The Baseball Writers' Association of America (BBWAA) voted by mail to select from recent major league players and
elected Don Sutton. The Veterans Committee met in closed sessions and selected four people from multiple classified ballots: George Davis, Larry Doby, Lee MacPhail, and Bullet Rogan. A formal induction ceremony was held in Cooperstown, New York, on July 26, 1998.

The BBWAA election 
The BBWAA was authorized to elect players active in 1978 or later, but not after 1992; the ballot included candidates from the 1997 ballot who received at least 5% of the vote but were not elected, along with selected players, chosen by a screening committee, whose last appearance was in 1992. All 10-year members of the BBWAA were eligible to vote.

Voters were instructed to cast votes for up to 10 candidates; any candidate receiving votes on at least 75% of the ballots would be honored with induction to the Hall. The ballot consisted of 26 players; 473 ballots were cast, with 355 votes required for election. A total of 2,559 votes were cast, an average of 5.41 per ballot. Those candidates receiving less than 5% of the vote (24 votes) would not appear on future BBWAA ballots, and under then-current rules were also eliminated from future consideration by the Veterans Committee. A 2001 change in Hall policy restored the eligibility of players dropped from BBWAA balloting for Veterans Committee consideration.

Candidates who were eligible for the first time are indicated here with a dagger (†). The one candidate who received at least 75% of the vote and were elected is indicated in bold italics; candidates who have since been selected in subsequent elections are indicated in italics. The seven candidates who received less than 5% of the vote, thus becoming ineligible for future BBWAA consideration, are indicated with an asterisk (*).

Ron Santo was on the ballot for the 15th and final time.

The newly-eligible players included 17 All-Stars, nine of whom were not included on the ballot, representing a total of 44 All-Star selections. Among the new candidates were 11-time All-Star Gary Carter, 6-time All-Star Willie Randolph and 5-time All-Stars Pedro Guerrero. The field also included one Cy Young Award-winner, Mike Flanagan.
 
Players eligible for the first time who were not included on the ballot were: Jim Acker, Dave Anderson, Floyd Bannister, Jesse Barfield, Juan Berenguer, Dave Bergman, Don Carman, Rick Cerone, Mike Fitzgerald, Jim Gantner, Rich Gedman, Jerry Don Gleaton, Von Hayes, Brook Jacoby, Dennis Lamp, John Moses, Rance Mulliniks, Ken Oberkfell, Gary Pettis, Jamie Quirk, Rafael Ramirez, Don Robinson, Luis Salazar, Dave Schmidt, Mike Scioscia, Matt Sinatro, Dave Smith, Pat Tabler, Walt Terrell, and Denny Walling.

The Veterans Committee 

The Veterans Committee met in closed sessions to elect as many as two executives, managers, umpires, and older major league players—the categories considered in all its meetings since 1953.
By an arrangement since 1995 it separately considered candidates from the Negro leagues and from the 19th century with authority to select one from each of those two special ballots.

The committee elected four people, the maximum number permitted:
center fielder Larry Doby from the 1950s, executive Lee MacPhail from the 1960s, pitcher Bullet Rogan from the Negro leagues, and shortstop George Davis from the 19th century.

J. G. Taylor Spink Award 
Sam Lacy
received the J. G. Taylor Spink Award honoring a baseball writer.
(The award was voted at the December 1997 meeting of the BBWAA, dated 1997, and included in the summer 1998 ceremonies.)

Ford C. Frick Award 
Jaime Jarrín
received the Ford C. Frick Award honoring a baseball broadcaster.

References

External links 
 1998 Election at www.baseballhalloffame.org.

Baseball Hall of Fame balloting
Hall of Fame balloting